Lee Upton (born June 2, 1953 St. Johns, Michigan) is an American poet, fiction writer, literary critic, and a graduate of the MFA Program for Poets & Writers at the University of Massachusetts Amherst.

Life
She is the author of several books of poetry, fiction, and literary criticism, including The Muse of Abandonment (1998, Bucknell University Press), Civilian Histories (2000, University of Georgia Press), Undid in the Land of Undone (2007, New Issues/Western Michigan University Press), and The Guide to the Flying Island (2009, Miami University Press).  She is a professor of English and writer in residence at Lafayette College in Easton, Pennsylvania.  In 1990 Upton collaborated with artist Ed Kerns and fellow poet Charles Molesworth on a collaborative exhibition of poetry and images at the Williams Center in Easton.

Her work has appeared in The Atlantic Monthly, the New Republic, American Poetry Review, Harvard Review, DoubleTake.

Awards
 2008 Miami University Press Novella Prize
 Lyric Poetry Award
 Writer Magazine/Emily Dickinson Award at the group’s 95th annual awards ceremony April 28, 2005 at The New School in New York City.
 1988 National Poetry Series, for No Mercy,

Her poems
 "Undid in the Land of Undone", Poetry Daily
 "The Stacks"; "Body Doubles", Caffeine Destiny
Apology To Keats  	
Destruction Of Daughters
Hog Roast 	
Indispensable Sign 	
Interrupting An Addict 	
The Broom 	
The Crying Room 	
The Fish House 	
The How And Why Of Rocks And Minerals 	
The Table

Bibliography

Poetry 
Collections

Interior Transformations

List of poems

Novels

Short fiction 
Collections

Nonfiction

Anthologies

References

External links
"Award-Winning Poet", Oberlin College
 "Lee Upton Biography", American Poetry
"Lee Upton at the New School [reviewed by Angela Patrinos]"
"Lee Upton", Here Comes Everybody, January 25, 2005
"Interview with Lee Upton", Adirondack Review

1953 births
Living people
The New Yorker people
University of Massachusetts Amherst MFA Program for Poets & Writers alumni
People from St. Johns, Michigan